Route 222 is a provincial highway located in the Estrie region of Quebec, Canada. The  highway runs from the junction of Route 139 in Roxton Falls and ends at the junction of Route 143 in Sherbrooke just east of Autoroute 55. It also has a brief concurrency with Route 243 in Racine.

Municipalities along Route 222
 Roxton Falls
 Roxton (Canton)
 Sainte-Christine
 Maricourt
 Valcourt (Canton)
 Valcourt
 Racine
 Saint-Denis-de-Brompton
 Sherbrooke - (Bromptonville)

See also
 List of Quebec provincial highways

References

External links 
 Official Road Network Map of Transport Quebec 
Route 222 on Google Maps

222
Transport in Sherbrooke